Kumi University (KUMU), is a private University in Uganda.

Location
The coordinates of Kumi University Main Campus are 1°28'21.0"N, 33°51'45.0"E (Latitude:1.472500; Longitude:33.862500).

History
The institution was founded in 1996 by a South Korean missionary couple, Hyeong Lyeol Lyu and Min Ja Lee, under the name African Leaders Training Institute. In 1999, the name was changed to Kumi University. The university was fully accredited by the Ministry of Education and Sports in 2004. Arrangements are underway to attain a university charter. According to a 2012 published report, efforts were underway to start a medical school at this university.

Overview
Enrollment at the university remains below capacity, leading to inadequate finances. In 2015, some of the staff, particularly the part-time lecturers went unpaid, leading to a lecturers' strike.

Academics
, the university had the following functioning faculties:

 Faculty of Education and Languages
 Faculty of Science and Technology
 Faculty of Social Sciences and Management Studies
 Faculty of Theology

Courses
Courses offered lead to the award of certificates, diplomas, and bachelor's degrees. The following degree courses were offered at Kumi University as of February 2018:

Faculty of Education and Languages
 Bachelor of Science with Education
 Bachelor of Arts with Education
 Bachelor of Education (In service)
Bachelor Arts in Primary Education
Diploma in Primary Education 
Bachelor of Education with ICT

Faculty of Science and Technology
 Bachelor of Information Technology
 Diploma in Information Technology
 Certificate in Information Technology
Bachelor of Agricultural Science
Diploma in Agricultural Science
Certificate in Agriculture

Faculty of Social Sciences and Management Studies
 Bachelor of Business Administration
 Bachelor of Human Resource Management
 Bachelor of Administrative & Secretarial Studies 
 Bachelor of Commerce
 Bachelors in Social Work and Social Administration 
 Bachelors in Development Studies 
 Bachelors in Guidance and Counseling 
 Bachelors in Community Development
 Bachelor of Public Administration
Diploma in Records and Archives Management
Certificate in Records and Archives Management

In addition to the degree courses, the university offers many diploma and certificate courses in the same or related fields.

See also
List of universities in Uganda
List of medical schools in Uganda
Education in Uganda

References

External links
 Website of Kumi University

Universities and colleges in Uganda
Kumi District
Teso sub-region
Educational institutions established in 2004
Education in Uganda
2004 establishments in Uganda
Eastern Region, Uganda